The Secret Land is a feature-length 1948 documentary film about the United States Navy expedition code-named "Operation Highjump" to Antarctica in 1946. The film, which was shot entirely by USN and US Army military photographers, focuses on the mission to explore the polar region and evaluate its potential for military operations. 

The Secret Land was narrated by actors Robert Taylor, Robert Montgomery, and Van Heflin, and produced by Orville O. Dull. It won the 1948 Oscar for Best Documentary Feature.

Plot
The film re-enacts scenes from several critical moments during the operation, such as shipboard damage control and Rear Admiral Richard E. Byrd throwing items out of an airplane to lighten it to avoid crashing when one of its engines  failed and the other began to falter under the excess load. Another scene features Chief of Naval Operations Fleet Admiral Chester W. Nimitz discussing Operation Highjump with admirals Richard E. Byrd and Richard H. Cruzen prior to their departure. Also depicted are the rescue of a crew of a crashed aircraft and the discovery of an Antarctic "oasis" of bare ground and ice-free fresh water lakes atop a thermal bulge deep inland.

Cast
 Robert Montgomery as Narrator (voice) (as Comdr. Robert Montgomery, U.S.N.R.)
 Robert Taylor as Narrator (voice) (as Lt. Robert Taylor U.S.N.R.)
 Van Heflin as Narrator (voice) (as Lt. Van Heflin, A.A.F., Ret.)
 James Forrestal as Himself (as James V. Forrestal)
 Chester W. Nimitz as Himself
 Rear Admiral Richard E. Byrd as Himself (as Admiral Byrd)
 Richard H. Cruzen as Himself (as Admiral Cruzen)
 Robert S. Quackenbush as Himself (as Captain Quackenbush)
 George J. Dufek as Himself (as Captain George Dufek)
 Paul A. Siple as Himself (as Dr. Siple)
 Charles W. Thomas as Himself (as Captain Thomas)
 Richard E. Byrd Jr. as Himself
 Vernon D. Boyd as Himself (as Captain Boyd)
 Charles A. Bond as Himself (as Captain Bond)
 David E. Bunger as Himself (as Commander David E. Bunger)
 John E. Clark as Himself (as Captain Clark)

Reception
The film earned $395,000 in the US and Canada and $181,000 elsewhere, resulting in a profit of $10,000.

Awards
The Secret Land won the  Best Documentary Feature oscar at the 21st Academy Awards in 1948.

See also
 Survival film, about the film genre, with a list of related films

References

External links
 
 
 
 
 
 The Secret Land at the National Archives and Records Administration

1948 films
1948 documentary films
American documentary films
Best Documentary Feature Academy Award winners
Documentary films about aviation
Metro-Goldwyn-Mayer films
Black-and-white documentary films
Documentary films about Antarctica
Films about the United States Navy
American black-and-white films
1940s English-language films
1940s American films